Jet lag is a physiological syndrome.

Jet Lag may also refer to:

Music
 Jetlag (band), American band
 Jet Lag (Premiata Forneria Marconi album), 1977
 Jet Lag (Josiah Wolf album), 2010
 Jet Lag (Milosh album)
 "Jet Lag" (song), a 2011 song by Simple Plan
 "Jet Lag", a 1974 song by Nazareth, from the album Rampant
 "Jet Lag", a 2004 song by Joss Stone, from the album Mind Body & Soul
 "Jet Lag", a 2008 song by Frank Turner, from the album Love Ire & Song
 "Jet Lag", a 2002 song by Brendan Benson, from the album Lapalco

Other
 Jet Lag (film), a 2002 film starring Juliette Binoche and Jean Reno
 Jet Lag: The Game, a travel competition show
 Jetlag Productions, an American animation studio

See also
 Cultural jet lag, cultural disconnection syndrome
 "Jet Lagged", a 1981 song by Smokie